Jori Mørkve (born 29 December 1980) is a Norwegian former biathlete.

Career
Mørkve debuted in the World Cup in 2001 in Oberhof with a 77th-place finish. In 2005, she came in 49th in the 15 km in Antholz-Anterselva. Her best achievement in the world cup was a third place with the Norwegian relay team from Hochfilzen in the season of 2006–07. She was named to the Norwegian team in the mixed relay at the World Championship 2007 in Antholz-Anterselva. Together with Tora Berger, Emil Hegle Svendsen and Frode Andresen, the Norwegian mixed relay team earned a bronze medal. She also won a bronze medal with the Norwegian team in the 4 × 6 km relay together with Tora Berger, Ann Kristin Flatland and Linda Grubben.

Mørkve retired after the 2015–16 season.

Biathlon results
All results are sourced from the International Biathlon Union.

World Championships
2 medals (2 bronze)

*During Olympic seasons competitions are only held for those events not included in the Olympic program.

World Cup

References

External links
 

1980 births
Living people
People from Voss
Norwegian female biathletes
Biathlon World Championships medalists
Sportspeople from Vestland
21st-century Norwegian women